Peter Menne (born 1960 in Unna, North Rhine-Westphalia) is a German production designer, stage designer, painter and musician.

Career 
Menne studied Fine Arts and Stage Design at the National Academy of Fine Arts in Düsseldorf under Tony Cragg and Luise Kimme. He subsequently travelled and worked in many areas of the world, and had art exhibitions in Germany, Netherlands, Austria, and Australia.

His illustrations were published in "Tempo" and "Playboy" magazine.

He began working in stage design and graphic arts at Hoffmanns Comic Teater in 1976, on a production of Unna. He has since worked on stage design for more than 45 theatre, musical and opera productions around Germany.

Filmography 
 1990: Türmers Traum – Director: diverse, WDR
 1996: Zwei Tage Grau – Director: Jörg Siepmann – Harry Flöter, Angst Film
 1997: Hotel – Director: Harry Flöter – Jörg Siepmann, Angst Film
 1998: Silverstar – Director: Jörg Siepmann – Harry Flöter, Flöter Siepmann Film
 1998: 5 Uhr Schatten – Director: Andreas Wunderlich, September Film
 1999: L'Amour, l'Argent, l'Amour – Director: Philip Gröning, Gröning Film
 1999: Pola X – Director: Leos Carax, Pandora Film, Art Director Germany
 1999: Rembrandt – Director: Charles Matton, Ognon Pictures, Art Director
 1999: Luckys grosse Abenteuer – Director: Sergei Bodrov, Columbia Pictures. Art Director Germany
 2000: Wolfsheim – Director: Nicole Weegmann, SWR
 2001: Die Frau, die an Dr. Fabian zweifelte – Director: Andi Rogenhagen, Lichtblick Film
 2001:  – Director: , Goldkind Film
 2001: Do Fish Do It? – Director: Almut Getto, Icon Film
 2002: Besser als Schule – Director: Simon Rost, Schokolade Film
 2002: Sea of Silence – Director: Stijn Coninx, Isabella Films
 2003: Schwer verknallt – Director: Josh Broecker, Cameo Film
 2003: Dear Wendy – Director: Thomas Vinterberg, Zentropa, Art Director
 2004: Rabenkinder – Director: Nicole Weegmann, zero west
 2004: Tatort – Erfroren – Director: Züli Aladag, Colonia Media Film
 2005: Emma's Bliss – Director: Sven Taddicken, Wüste Film
 2005: Rage – Director: Züli Aladag, Colonia Media Filmp 
 2006: Vivere – Director: Angelina Maccarone, Elsani Film
 2007:  – Director: Felix Randau, Wüste Film West
 2007: Messy Christmas – Director: Vanessa Jopp, X Filme Creative Pool
 2007: Zweier Ohne – Director: Jobst Oetzmann, Lichtblick Film
 2008:  – Director: Bettina Oberli, Wüste Film, Christiane Krumwiede - Peter Menne
 2008: 12 Meter ohne Kopf – Director: Sven Taddicken, Wüste Film
 2010: Alive and Ticking – Director: Andi Rogenhagen, Wüste Film
 2011: Die Libelle und das Nashorn – Director: Lola Randl, Coin Film
 2012: 300 Worte Deutsch – Director: Züli Aladag, Sperl Productions
 2014: Tatort – Schwerelos – Director: Züli Aladag, Geißendörfer Film und Fernsehproduktion
 2016: NSU German History X: Die Opfer – Vergesst mich nicht – Director: Züli Aladag, Wiedemann & Berg Television
 2017: Rock my Heart – Director: Hanno Olderdissen, Neue Schönhauser Filmproduktion
 2018: Harter Brocken – Der Geheimcode – Director: Markus Sehr, H&V Entertainment
 2019: Irish Crime Scene - Forgiveness  – Director: Züli Aladag, Good friends Filmproduction
 2019: Irish Crime Scene - Samhain, The Night of the Dead  – Director: Züli Aladag, Good friends Filmproduction

References

External links 
 
 Crew United
 Web Galleries

1960 births
Living people
20th-century German painters
20th-century German male artists
21st-century German painters
21st-century German male artists
Film people from North Rhine-Westphalia
German male musicians
German male painters
German production designers
People from Unna